Chapeaugraphy, occasionally anglicised to chapography, is a novelty act and a busking trick in which a ring-shaped piece of felt is manipulated to look like various types of hats. The act originated in 1618 with Parisian street performer Tabarin, the most famous of the charlatans who combined a French version of commedia dell'arte with a quack medicine show.

In the 1870s another French comedian, revived the act and managed 15 hat-twisting styles in his act.

Although rarely seen today, it was featured in an episode of Saturday Night Live in 1985, as performed by magician Harry Anderson.

Types of hat that can be created:

baseball cap
American and British army hats from the Revolutionary War
pirate's hat
naval captain's hat
Mickey Mouse ears
Ushanka (a Russian fur hat)
mortarboard (a graduation cap)
Catholic nun's headwear
derby hat
and several inventive others.

Notable chapeaugraphers
Tabarin, a French comedian, the creator of Le Chapeau de Tabarin.
, another French comedian who revived the act.
Félicien Trewey, who brought the art form renewed interest and a new name, Treweyism, around the world in the 19th century after seeing Monsieur Fusier.
Paul Wildbaum, a Canadian physical comedy master.
Sir Richard, a New Zealand event host.
Fabrice, a French magician based on the Gold Coast in Australia, has an original routine which was presented at the Adelaide Magic Convention 2014.
Disguido, an Italian duo of Illusionists, have a routine dedicated to the history of cinema, prized with the "Mandrake d'Or", in 2013 in Paris ad with the Third place at the European Championship of Magic in Blackpool (UK). They have invented new types of figures: the phone, the horse and the grinder.

External links 
 Arturo Brachetti
 Félicien Trewey
 The art of chapeaugraphy; or, Twenty-five heads under one hat
 http://www.ilgiornale.it/news/cultura/quando-magia-nascosta-cappello-feltro-826726.html
Disguido

Sleight of hand